Romanski or Romansky is a Polish and/or Jewish toponymic habitational name deriving from places called Romany in Poland. Alternatively, the surname may derive from the given name Roman.

Notable examples 
Dave Romansky (born 1938), American athlete
Josh Romanski (born 1986), American baseball player
Adele Romanski (born 1982), American Academy Award-winning film producer

References 

Polish-language surnames
Slavic-language surnames